During World War II, the Italian Expeditionary Corps in Russia (CSIR) was a corps-sized expeditionary unit of the Regio Esercito (Royal Italian Army) that fought on the Eastern Front. In July 1942 the CSIR entered the newly formed Italian Army in Russia as XXXV Army Corps.

Formation
The CSIR was formed in an attempt to provide a somewhat mobile unit to fight on a front where mobility was key. The CSIR was created by Italian dictator Benito Mussolini to show solidarity with Nazi Germany after German dictator Adolf Hitler launched Operation Barbarossa and attacked the Soviet Union. Mussolini created the CSIR, despite the lack of enthusiasm shown by Hitler, on 10 July 1941 and between July and August 1941, the units of the CSIR arrived in southern Russia. The CSIR included an Aviation Command with a limited number of fighters, bombers and transport aircraft. This command was part of the Regia Aeronautica (Italian Royal Air Force) and was also known as the Expeditionary Air Corps in Russia.

The CSIR was initially subordinated to the German 11th Army (General Eugen Ritter von Schobert).  On 14 August 1941, the CSIR was transferred to the control of German Panzer Group 1 (General Ewald von Kleist). On 25 October 1941, Panzer Group 1 was renamed the 1st Panzer Army. The CSIR remained under von Kleist's command until 3 June 1942 when it was subordinated to the German 17th Army (General Richard Ruoff).

Composition 

The CSIR was composed of three divisions: 3rd Cavalry Division "Principe Amedeo Duca d'Aosta", 9th Infantry Division "Pasubio", and 52nd Infantry Division "Torino". Torino and Pasubio were semi-motorised divisions, with an assortment of commercial vehicles, with company logos intact, pressed into service.  The Prince Amedeo Duke of Aosta Division was a combination of traditional saber wielding horse cavalry and motorized units, with much of the division's artillery horse-drawn. The highly-mobile riflemen in this unit made use of motorcycles or bicycles.

The initial strength of the CSIR stood at about 3,000 officers and 59,000 men, 5,500 motor vehicles, 220 artillery pieces, 92 anti-tank guns, 83 aeroplanes and 4,600 horses and mules. The units of the CSIR were primarily lightly armed infantry, horse cavalry and mobile riflemen.  The Torino and Pasubio divisions were each composed of two infantry regiments and a regiment of artillery.  The Prince Amedeo Duke of Aosta Fast Division was composed of four regiments, the Regiment "Savoia Cavalleria" (3rd), Regiment "Lancieri di Novara" (5th), the 3rd Fast Artillery Regiment and the 3rd Bersaglieri Regiment. The units of the CSIR were a mixed bag and were transported by truck, horse, car, motorcycle, bicycle or as was the case all too often, on foot. While the Amedeo Duke of Aosta Division did include 60 obsolete tankettes and light tanks (Fiat L3 or Fiat L6/40), mostly in its one tank battalion, as well as anti-tank guns (Cannone da 47/32 M35), there was nothing in the Italian arsenal able to counter the numerous and technically superior Soviet tanks like the T-34/76 or KV I.

The Aviation Command of the CSIR had less than 100 Macchi C.200 Saetta (Lightning) fighters, Caproni Ca.311 light reconnaissance-bombers and Savoia-Marchetti SM.81 Pipistrello (Bat) tri-motor transports. The CSIR included the Special Intendancy East which provided medical, commissariat, administration, artillery, chemical, horse and veterinary, transport, automotive, staging, mail and telegraphic services.

Commanders 
The CSIR's original commander was General Francesco Zingales. He fell ill in Vienna during the early stages of transport to Russia and on 14 July 1941, was replaced by General Giovanni Messe. Messe was never satisfied with the equipment and support available to the CSIR and pointed out the lack of adequate winter equipment. Therefore he was replaced in November 1942 by Francesco Zingales under whose command the Corps would be all but destroyed and returned to Italy in April 1943.

Giovanni Messe (1941.07.14 – 1942.11.01)
Francesco Zingales (1942.11.01	– 1943.07.12)
Arturo Taranto (1943.07.12 – 1943.07.27) acting		
Alessandro Gloria (1943.07.27 – 1943.09.08)

Operations 

The CSIR was sent to the southern sector of the German advance in the Ukraine in July 1941. In August, as part of the German 11th Army, the CSIR made its first contact with the Red Army. The CSIR pursued retreating Soviet troops between the Bug River and Dniester River. While the 11th Army conducted the Siege of Odessa, the CSIR was attached to Panzer Group 1. In its early encounters the CSIR was successful, taking a number of towns and cities and creating a favourable impression on its German allies. Its most notable early victory came at the Battle of Petrikowka in September 1941, where the Italians encircled some sizeable Red Army units, inflicting unknown casualties on them and capturing over 10,000 prisoners of war as well as significant numbers of weapons and horses. This cost 291 Italian casualties, 87 killed, 190 wounded and 14 missing. On October 20, the CSIR and the German XLIXth Mountain Corps captured the big industrial city of Stalino (now Donetsk) after determined resistance from the Soviet defenders. Units from the Pasubio Motorized Division captured the neighboring city of Gorlovka, an industrial town of around 100,000 inhabitants, on November 2. While the CSIR did not participate in the siege of Odessa, Italian troops assisted in the occupation of the Odessa area after the city fell on 16 October 1941.

With the onset of winter, the CSIR units began consolidating their occupation zone and preparing defensive works. In the last week of December, the 3rd Mobile Division was counter-attacked by Soviet forces and managed to repel the attacks long enough for the 1st Panzer Army to reinforce the sector and defeat the Soviet attack. The "Christmas Battle" was hailed as a great victory in Italy, though the division likely would have fallen without German support. It subsequently weathered the 1941–1942 winter quite well in its relatively quiet occupation zone.

Italian Army in the Soviet Union 
In July 1942, the CSIR was incorporated into the far larger Italian Army in Russia (ARMIR) when Mussolini decided to expand the Italian presence in the Soviet Union. The three divisions of the CSIR all became part of the ARMIR XXXV Army Corps.

Notes

Bibliography

 Faldella, Emilio. L'Italia nella seconda guerra mondiale. Cappelli Bologna 1959 (Italian)
 Jowett, Philip S.  The Italian Army 1940-45 (1):  Europe 1940–1943.  Osprey, Oxford - New York, 2000. 
 Mack Smith, Denis. Le guerre del duce. Laterza, Bari 1979 (Italian)
 Messe, Giovanni. La guerra al fronte Russo. Il Corpo di Spedizione Italian (CSIR). Milano 1947 (Italian)

Italy–Soviet Union relations
Army corps of Italy in World War II
Expeditionary units and formations
Military units and formations established in 1941
Military units and formations disestablished in 1942
Military units and formations of the Soviet–German War